“Bailey Park” is a song by Tullycraft, recorded with producer Pat Maley in the Capitol Theater at Yoyo Studios in Olympia, Washington. The birds heard at the beginning of the track are not a sample, Maley hung a second microphone out of a second floor theatre window while Tollefson was recording his vocals. The birds heard on the track are downtown Olympia birds recorded at the same time as the vocals. Guitarist Gary Miklusek once said: “'Bailey Park' ranks as a top song for me. Live it was a blast to play and almost a guaranteed string-breaker… perhaps my only sore memories of Tullycraft.”

“Sweet” was the b-side. "Sweet" also appeared on the band’s debut album Old Traditions, New Standards. In 2007 the song was used in a television commercial for the hot-dog chain Wienerschnitzel. It was licensed without the band's knowledge or permission. The licensing was handled by Darla, the California-based record label that had reissued Old Traditions, New Standards. Tullycraft were not very happy when they learned of the commercial.

“Pedal” was a short re-working of the song that Tollefson had written and recorded with the band Crayon. Pat Maley introduced the idea and even integrated samples of Beat Happening and Tiger Trap from master tapes found in the studio. The idea was to spoof a Pet Shop Boys dance track. In 1997, the Vancouver-based band, Gaze covered the song “Pedal” on their So Sad single.

Track listing
 "Bailey Park"
 "Sweet"
 "Pedal"

Personnel
 Sean Tollefson – vocals, bass
 Jeff Fell – drums
 Gary Miklusek – guitar, backing vocals
 Pat Maley – production, audio engineering
 Aaron Gorseth – production assistance
 Rose Melberg – backing vocals on "Pedal"

References 

 Strong, M. C. (2003). The Great Indie Discography (2nd Edition) pg. 1041. Published by Canon Books Ltd. (US/CAN) .
 Discogs . Bailey Park. Retrieved on November 14, 2008.
 Johnston, M. . The Case Of The Wienerschnitzel Song. Retrieved on November 15, 2008. 
 Discogs . So Sad. Retrieved on November 14, 2008.

1990 singles
1990 songs